Eric Quail Davies (26 August 1909 – 11 November 1976) was a South African cricketer who played in five Test matches from 1936 to 1939. He was born in King William's Town and died in Port Alfred, both in Cape Province.

Davies was a left-handed tail-end batsman and a right-arm fast bowler with a short first-class cricket career spread over many seasons. He first appeared for Eastern Province in three matches in the 1929–30 season and took four wickets for 36 against Rhodesia in the third of these. He then played just one match in 1930–31 and a further single game in 1934–35, with little success in either.

Test cricket
In 1935–36, the Australians toured South Africa and with the season half over played a first-class match against Eastern Province. The Australians won the game easily by an innings inside two days, but Davies scored a personal success by taking six Australian wickets for 80 runs in the Australian innings. That led to his selection for the fourth Test of the five-match series; the game was a crushing defeat inside two days for the South Africans, but Davies performed well, taking four Australian wickets for 75 runs in the touring team's only innings. Davies retained his place for the fifth Test where the result was a similarly heavy defeat, though South Africa batted better and the match lasted to the fourth day; Davies, however, was not successful and failed to take a wicket.

After this flurry of cricket activity, Davies played in only one match in 1936–37 and none at all the following season. But in 1938–39 he had an almost identical experience to 1935–36, turning out in a single first-class match for a provincial side against the touring team, doing well and then being inserted into the Test team. This time, he played for Transvaal against the Marylebone Cricket Club (MCC) team, and took six wickets for 82 runs in the tourists' only innings. He also "felled" the England opening batsman Len Hutton with the third ball of the innings. His subsequent selection in the Test team for the first game of a five-match series may have looked inspired when he took the wicket of Bill Edrich in the first over of the first Test, but it proved to be his only wicket of the game. It was not much different in the second game of the series: Davies took one wicket, that of Wally Hammond, but Hammond had made 181 by that time and England's total reached 559 before they declared, though the match ended as a draw. And there was a third single wicket for Davies in the third match, and this time his 15 eight-ball overs went for 106 runs. He was dropped from the Test team after this match and did not play international cricket again.

In fact, he played very little further first-class cricket: in the ad hoc cricket of the 1945–46 season in South Africa, with no official tournaments organised for the first season after the Second World War, he turned out three times for North-Eastern Transvaal and those were his final first-class games. Outside cricket, he was a schoolmaster.

References

1909 births
1976 deaths
Sportspeople from Qonce
South African people of Welsh descent
South Africa Test cricketers
South African cricketers
Eastern Province cricketers
Northerns cricketers
Gauteng cricketers